Višnjica may refer to several places:

 Višnjica, Serbia, a settlement in Palilula, Belgrade
 Višnjica (Ilijaš), a village in Bosnia and Herzegovina
 Višnjica (Kiseljak), a village in Bosnia and Herzegovina
 Višnjica, Sisak-Moslavina County, a village near Jasenovac, Croatia
 Višnjica, Split-Dalmatia County, a village near Vrgorac, Croatia
 Višnjica, Virovitica-Podravina County, a village near Sopje, Croatia
 , a village near Lepoglava, Croatia
 Gornja Višnjica, a village near Lepoglava, Croatia
 Mahala Višnjica
 Polje Višnjica
 Višnjica, Montenegro